The accumulation function a(t) is a function defined in terms of time t expressing the ratio of the value at time t (future value) and the initial investment (present value). It is used in interest theory. 

Thus a(0)=1 and the value at time t is given by:

.  
where the initial investment is 

For various interest-accumulation protocols, the accumulation function is as follows (with i denoting the interest rate and d denoting the discount rate):
simple interest: 
compound interest: 
simple discount: 
compound discount: 

In the case of a positive rate of return, as in the case of interest, the accumulation function is an increasing function.

Variable rate of return
The logarithmic or continuously compounded return, sometimes called force of interest, is a function of time defined as follows: 

which is the rate of change with time of the natural logarithm of the accumulation function.

Conversely:

reducing to

for constant .

The effective annual percentage rate at any time is:

See also
Time value of money

Mathematical finance